The 2013–14 season was Udinese Calcio's  34th season in Serie A and their 19th consecutive season in the top-flight. The club competed in Serie A, finishing 13th, and reached the semi-finals of the Coppa Italia. Having finished fifth in the 2012–13 Serie A, Udinese qualified for the third qualifying round of the UEFA Europa League. The team, however, failed to qualify for the group stage of the tournament, becoming the only Italian team to fail to qualify for a European group stage during the 2013–14 season.

Players

Squad information

Competitions

Serie A

League table

Results summary

Results by round

Matches

Coppa Italia

UEFA Europa League

Third qualifying round

Play-off round

Statistics

Appearances and goals

Goalscorers

Clean sheets

Disciplinary record

References

Udinese Calcio seasons
Udinese
Udinese